Shamir Thomas (born 3 November 1983) is a Grenadian retired track and field athlete who specialized in the throwing events. With multiple CARIFTA and other games medals, Shamir is one of the most successful Grenadian athletes in the throwing events at the Youth and Junior levels.

Competition record

References

External links

1983 births
Living people
Male shot putters
Grenadian male discus throwers